Liaison Office is the name of some organization or de facto embassies, which may refer to:
Liaison Office (Hong Kong), the representative office of China (PRC) government in Hong Kong
Liaison Office (Macao), the representative office of China (PRC) government in Macao
Taipei Liaison Office in the Republic of South Africa, the representative office of ROC (Taiwan) government in South Africa
Liaison Office of the Republic of South Africa, the representative office of South Africa government in ROC (Taiwan)
Inter-Korean Liaison Office, the joint representative office of North and South Korea government.

De facto embassies